Hartley Gordon James "Harry" Cant (19 November 1907 – 3 March 1977) was an Australian politician. Born at Mount Magnet, Western Australia, he was educated at state schools and then the Kalgoorlie School of Mines, becoming a miner. He was an official with the Australian Workers' Union. In 1958, he was elected to the Australian Senate as a Labor Senator for Western Australia. He held the seat until 1974, when he retired. Cant died in 1977.

References

Australian Labor Party members of the Parliament of Australia
Members of the Australian Senate for Western Australia
Members of the Australian Senate
1907 births
1977 deaths
People from Mount Magnet, Western Australia
20th-century Australian politicians